Razundara Tjikuzu (born 12 December 1979) is a Namibian former professional footballer who spent most of his career playing in Germany and Turkey and who represented Namibia at international level.

Career

In Germany
Born in Swakopmund, South West Africa, Tjikuzu moved to Germany as a 14-year-old in 1995, joining SV Werder Bremen. At Werder Bremen, he rose through the youth ranks spending four years in the club's academy before being promoted to the reserves in 1998 and playing in the Regionalliga Nord, Germany's third tier at the time.

On 14 August 1999, Tjikuzu made his debut for the first team in the Bundesliga at the age of 19. He went on to make made 25 league appearances in his first season. In 2003, after eight years at Werder Bremen and having made 86 appearances in all competitions for the club, he was told to search for a new club.

In 2003, Tijkuzu moved to Bundesliga rivals Hansa Rostock. Following a strong first season, he signed with Hamburger SV, but after a drunken car crash and missing training, he was instantly dismissed by Rostock and his contract with Hamburger SV was also rescinded.

He spent the 2005–2006 Bundesliga season at MSV Duisburg who were relegated.

In Turkey
In summer 2006, Tjikuzu moved to Turkish side Çaykur Rizespor. A year later, he left Çaykur Rizespor for the newly promoted Süper Lig side İstanbul Büyükşehir Belediyespor where he started playing as a defensive midfielder. In summer 2009, he signed with Trabzonspor. On 11 January 2010, after just half a season in Trabzon, he joined Diyarbakırspor on loan for the rest of the season with whom he suffered relegation. In summer 2010, he moved to Kasımpaşa S.K. signing a two-year contract. After making 23 appearances in another season which ended with relegation, he was released from his contract.

International career
Tjikuzu had previously made over 55 appearances for Namibia but was not in their squad for the 2008 African Cup of Nations.

Career statistics

Club

Notes

International goals
Scores and results list Namibia's goal tally first, score column indicates score after each Tjikuzu goal.

References

External links
 
 
 

1979 births
Living people
Sportspeople from Swakopmund
Namibian men's footballers
Association football midfielders
Association football fullbacks
Namibia international footballers
SV Werder Bremen players
SV Werder Bremen II players
FC Hansa Rostock players
MSV Duisburg players
Bundesliga players
Çaykur Rizespor footballers
İstanbul Başakşehir F.K. players
Trabzonspor footballers
Diyarbakırspor footballers
Kasımpaşa S.K. footballers
Süper Lig players
Namibian expatriate footballers
Namibian expatriate sportspeople in Germany
Expatriate footballers in Germany
Expatriate footballers in Turkey